Llangollen Football and Athletic Club were a Welsh football team from Llangollen, Denbighshire.

History
Llangollen were formed on Tuesday 22 October 1872, at the National Schoolroom by members of Llangollen Cricket Club. Their first match was played on The Recreation Ground on Saturday 26 October 1872. The club reformed again on Monday 10 September 1877. The club has the honour of playing in the inaugural Welsh Cup competition. On 22 October 1880 the club changed their name to Berwyn Rangers.

Cup History

Other Info
Not to be confused with Llangollen Town F.C.

References

Defunct football clubs in Wales
Sport in Wrexham
Sport in Wrexham County Borough